Rudolf Gnägi (3 August 1917 – 20 April 1985) was a Swiss politician and member of the Swiss Federal Council (1966–1979).

He was elected to the Federal Council of Switzerland on 8 December 1965 and handed over office on 31 December 1979. He was affiliated to the Party of Farmers, Traders and Independents (BGB/PAI), which became the Swiss People's Party in 1972. 

During his office time he held the following departments:
Federal Department of Transport, Communications and Energy (1966–1967)
Federal Military Department (1968)
Federal Department of Transport, Communications and Energy (1968)
Federal Military Department (1969–1979)

He was President of the Swiss Confederation twice in 1971 and 1976.

His name is popularly remembered as the nickname of a Swiss Armed Forces ordonnance item, an olive-green jumper officially named Trikothemd 75, but commonly known as Gnägi.

External links

1917 births
1985 deaths
People from Biel/Bienne District
Swiss Calvinist and Reformed Christians
Party of Farmers, Traders and Independents politicians
Swiss People's Party politicians
Members of the Federal Council (Switzerland)
Members of the National Council (Switzerland)
University of Bern alumni